In a brass instrument, a leadpipe or mouthpipe is the pipe or tube into which the mouthpiece is placed.

For example, on the illustration of a trombone, the leadpipe would be between #3 and #4, the mouthpiece and the slide lock ring. In the illustration of a French horn, the leadpipe is #2.

Detachable leadpipes

Most leadpipes are permanently fixed in the instrument, though aftermarket changes, usually carried out by a repairer, are quite common. Some instruments have a detachable leadpipe to allow changing key; to permit the player to easily select different playing and tonal characteristics; or simply to act as the instrument's main tuning slide where the shape, or other design issues, make this the best place for it. The use of the leadpipe as the main tuning slide is particularly common in flugelhorns and piccolo trumpets though not unknown in other instruments. For example, in the Selmer piccolo trumpet in the photograph, the leadpipes are used for all three functions: the aftermarket Blackburn pipes shown have different playing characteristics from those of the stock Selmer pipe; the choice of leadpipe determines whether the instrument is in A or B; it is also the main tuning slide.

See also
Bocal
Venturi effect

References

Brass instrument parts and accessories